Susann Beucke (born 11 June 1991) is a German sailor who competes in the 49er FX category. Along with Tina Lutz, she won a gold medal at the 2017 and 2020 49er & 49er FX European Championships. In their third attempt Beucke and Lutz qualified to represent Germany at the 2020 Summer Olympics in Tokyo, where they won a Silver medal, the best result for German sailing in 21 years.

She sailed as part of Team Holcim - PRB in The Ocean Race.

References

External links
 
 
 
 

1991 births
Living people
German female sailors (sport)
Olympic sailors of Germany
Olympic silver medalists for Germany
Olympic medalists in sailing
Sailors at the 2020 Summer Olympics – 49er FX
Medalists at the 2020 Summer Olympics
49er FX class sailors
Sportspeople from Kiel